Qoşçaq beg (died 1551) was a statesman (uğlan) in Khanate of Kazan. From 1546 to 1551 he was a head of government during the reigns of Safagäräy and Söyembikä. He struggled against pro-Muscovite opposition. After the victory of Şahğäli's coup, he was forced to escape from Kazan. Russians caught and executed him after he refused to be baptized.

References

History of Tatarstan
1551 deaths
Year of birth unknown